24th FFCC Awards
December 23, 2019

Best Picture:
Portrait of a Lady on Fire

The 24th Florida Film Critics Circle Awards were held on December 23, 2019.

The nominations were announced on December 19, 2019, led by Marriage Story with seven nominations.

Winners and nominees

Winners are listed at the top of each list in bold, while the runner-ups for each category are listed under them.

References

External links
 

2019 film awards
2010s